Fall for You is the fifth studio album by American recording artist Leela James. It was released by Shesangz Music under exclusive license to BMG Rights Management on July 8, 2014 in the United States. The album debuted and peaked at number 12 on Billboards Top R&B/Hip-Hop Albums chart and at number 69 on the Billboard 200 chart.

Critical reception

Allmusic editor Andy Kellman found that Fall for You offers "with an impressive synthesis of classic and contemporary sounds. The blend of styles [...] is made evident immediately, with lead song "Who's Gonna Love You More" opening with a buzzing synthesizer quickly offset by a typically gutsy and assertive vocal from James [...] While the percentage of excellent material isn't as high as it is on James' two previous albums, Fall for You is an engaging release with some pleasingly unaffected twists."

Track listing
Credits adapted from the liner notes of Fall for You.

Charts

Weekly charts

Year-end charts

References

External links
 

2014 albums
Leela James albums
Albums produced by Tim Kelley